The Statt Party is a minor political party in Germany.

Founded in 1993 in Hamburg, the party won 5.6% in the Hamburg state election and formed a coalition with the Social Democratic Party of Germany. In 1997 the party lost all seats.

References

External links
 

1993 establishments in Germany
Political parties established in 1993
Political parties in Germany
Politics of Hamburg
Right-wing populism in Germany